In the 2006 Georgia elections, Incumbent Governor Sonny Perdue, the first Republican Governor of Georgia since reconstruction, was re-elected over then-Lieutenant Governor Mark Taylor (D).

Prior to the elections, though Republicans held the Governor's mansion and majorities in both houses of the Georgia General Assembly, Democrats then-held five of the eight statewide offices. Following the elections, Republicans would pick up two positions, those being Lieutenant Governor and Secretary of State, with the victories of Casey Cagle (who became the eleventh overall and first ever Republican elected Lieutenant Governor) and Karen Handel (who became the twenty-sixth overall and first Republican since reconstruction to be Secretary of State) in each of their respective races. Both positions were open after the incumbent office holders chose to seek the governorship of Georgia.

All other state Executive Officers, Attorney General of Georgia Thurbert Baker (D), state Superintendent of Schools Kathy Cox (R), Commissioner of Insurance John Oxendine (R), Commissioner of Agriculture Tommy Irvin (D), and Commissioner of Labor Mike Thurmond (D), were re-elected. This was the last time Democrats won a statewide election in Georgia until 2020 when Democrat Joe Biden won the state in the presidential election as well as the last time democrats won statewide office in Georgia until Jon Ossoff and Raphael Warnock were elected to the Senate in 2021.

Federal elections

United States Congressional elections
In 2006, all thirteen of Georgia's U.S. House seats were up for election. Neither of the Peach state's U.S. Senate  seats were up for election that year.

United States House of Representatives elections

All thirteen of Georgia's incumbent Representatives sought re-election in 2006. Going into the elections, Republicans held seven of Georgia's U.S. House seats and Democrats held six seats.

Despite significant gains by Republicans in Georgia since 2002, such as consecutive Republican victories since in Presidential elections since 1996, gaining both of Georgia's U.S. Senate seats, the election of Sonny Perdue as Georgia's first post-Reconstruction Republican governor in 2002, successful elections of Republicans to other state executive offices, and gaining control of both chambers of the Georgia General Assembly for the first time since Reconstruction, Democrats have succeeded in gaining seats of Georgia's House delegation in recent House elections.

Following gains in both houses of the General Assembly in 2002 and 2004, Republicans enacted a mid-decade redistricting to alter the congressional districts created by the 146th Georgia General Assembly, which Democrats held control of at the time, with the intention of benefiting Republicans. Two Democratic incumbents who were especially targeted were Jim Marshall (GA-8) and John Barrow (GA-12). They were opposed respectively by former Representatives Mac Collins (who previously represented what is now the Third district) and Max Burns. These two races were among the most competitive in the nation, but ultimately resulted in both incumbents being re-elected by razor thin margins of 1 and 0.6 percentage points respectively.

The partisan makeup of Georgia's House delegation did not change, however one Incumbent, Cynthia McKinney (GA-4), was denied renomination by her 59% to 41% defeat in the Democratic Primary runoff to then-Dekalb county Commissioner Hank Johnson.

Governor

In the Republican primary, incumbent Sonny Perdue defeated challenger Ray McBerry by a margin of 88 percent to 12 percent. In the Democratic primary, Lieutenant Governor Mark Taylor defeated state Secretary of State Cathy Cox, Bill Bolton, and Mac McCarley with 51.7 percent of the vote to Cox's 44 percent, Bolton's 2 percent, and McCarley 2 percent. Libertarian Garrett Michael Hayes faced Perdue Mark Taylor in the general election. Independent John Dashler withdrew from the race, unable to collect the 40,000 signatures required for ballot access.

Perdue was re-elected to a second term, winning 57.9 percent of the vote.

Lieutenant governor

General election results

Primary Results
Democrats
 
 
 
 
 
 
 

 
 
 
 

Republicans
 
 
 
 

Libertarian
Allen Buckley

Secretary of State

General Election Results

Primary Results
Democrats

 
 
 
 
 
 
 
 

 
 
 
 

Republicans

 
 
 
 
 

 
 
 
 

Libertarian
Kevin Madsen

Attorney general

General Election Results

State School Superintendent

General election results

Primary election results

Democrats
 
 
 

Republicans
 
 
 

Libertarian
David Chastain

Commissioner of Insurance

General Election Results

Commissioner of Agriculture

General Election Results

Primary Results

Democrats

Tommy Irvin (incumbent)

Republicans

 
 
 

 
 
 
 

Libertarian
Jack Cashin

Commissioner of Labor

General election results

Primary election results
Democrats

Michael Thurmond (incumbent)

Republicans

Public Service Commission

District 3 
This is a statewide race.

General Election Results

Primary election results
Republicans
 
 
 

Democrats

David Burgess

Libertarians

Paul MacGregor

District 5 
This is a statewide race.

General Election Results

Primary Results
Republicans
 
 
 

Democrats

Dawn Randolph

Libertarians

Kevin Cherry

General Assembly elections

Georgia Senate elections

Georgia House of Representatives elections

Judicial elections
In 2006, four seats on the Supreme Court of Georgia and four on the Georgia Court of Appeals were up for election. All judicial elections in Georgia are officially non-partisan.

Supreme Court of Georgia elections
Incumbent state Supreme Court Associate Justices George H. Carley, Harold Melton, Hugh P. Thompson, and Carol W. Hunstein were all re-elected with three being unopposed. Only Hunstein received any opposition, which she overcame handily.

Supreme Court (Hunstein seat) election

Georgia Court of Appeals elections
Incumbent Judges John Ellington, M. Yvette Miller, Herbert E. Phipps, and J.D. Smith were re-elected without opposition.

References

External links 

 Statewide qualifiers
 Primary Election Results 
 Primary Runoff Results 
 General Election Results

 
Georgia